Comic Toranoana (コミックとらのあな) is a dōjin shop operated by the Toranoana Inc. (株式会社 虎の穴). This shop specializes in selling manga-related items. It is also known by the name, "Toranoana", or simply, "Tora".

About the company
The name, "Toranoana", comes from the name of the professional wrestling company of the same name in the anime series Tiger Mask.

In 1996, the company was established as a yugen kaisha. Soon the company expanded, with Akihabara as a center of this expansion, to many places in Tokyo and other large cities. Then in 2003, the company was converted into a kabushiki kaisha.

List of stores

Currently there are 15 stores in Japan, three of which closed a few years ago.

Japan
Sapporo store (Hokkaidō)
Sendai store (Miyagi)
Akihabara main store (Tokyo)
Akihabara store #2 (Tokyo)
Ikebukuro store (Tokyo)
Shinjuku store (Tokyo)
Machida store (Tokyo)
Yokohama store (Kanagawa)
Nagoya store (Aichi)
Umeda store (Osaka)
Namba store #1 (Osaka)
Namba store #2 (Osaka)
Sannomiya store (Hyogo)
Hiroshima store (Hiroshima)
Fukuoka store (Fukuoka)

Taiwan
Taipei store (Taipei)

External links

 Official Site 

Anime companies
Retail companies based in Tokyo
Mass media companies based in Tokyo
Retail companies established in 1996
1996 establishments in Japan
Manga industry
Chiyoda, Tokyo